An exchange-traded product (ETP) is a regularly priced security which trades during the day on a national stock exchange. ETPs may embed derivatives but it is not a requirement that they do so – and the investment memorandum (or offering documents) should be read with care to ensure that the pricing methodology and use (or not) of derivatives is explicitly stated. Typically, individual underlying securities, such as stocks and bonds, are not considered ETPs.

Overview
ETPs are often benchmarked to indices, stocks, commodities, or may be actively managed. There are several types of ETPs, including:

Closed-end funds (CEFs) are collective investment vehicles which restrict the investors right to redeem their units at net asset value (NAV)
Exchange-traded derivative contracts
Exchange-traded funds (ETFs) are mutual funds trading at a stock exchange having agreements in place to ensure that the stock exchange price always is close to the NAV
Exchange-traded notes (ETNs) are unsecured derivative debt obligations issued by banks or investment firms with a repayment value linked to an index or basket of assets
Exchange-traded commodities (ETCs) are asset-backed securities repackaging the value of commodities or currencies and listed at a stock exchange. ETCs are known in the European market where (other than in the U.S.) mutual funds cannot invest in single commodities or undiversified baskets of commodities. The distribution and marketing of ETCs thus is not regulated by mutual fund laws but by the Prospectus Directive.
Exchange-traded instruments (ETIs) are derivative securities repackaging the value of an index or even actively managed portfolio issued by financial institutions and listed at a stock exchange. ETIs are known in the European market where several investment strategies cannot be replicated within a mutual fund and ETIs are set up as an alternative investment vehicle to overcome these restrictions. The distribution and marketing of ETCs thus is not regulated by mutual fund laws but by the Prospectus Directive. These investment vehicles are sometimes also marketed as Exchange-traded certificates or (if unlisted) actively managed certificates (AMC)

ETPs also qualify for advanced types of orders such as limit orders and stop orders. This is in contrast to traditional mutual funds which are only available for buying and selling at certain points in the day.

Regulation 
On October 6 of 2021, SEC Chair Gary Gensler warned that leveraged exchange traded products present a risk to the "stability of financial markets" and called for tighter regulations on the "complex" products. He said "[leveraged ETPs] can pose risks even to sophisticated investors and can potentially create system-wide risks by operating in unanticipated ways when markets experience volatility or stress conditions". Leveraged ETFs have been found to exaggerate intraday momentum. However, this momentum is often rebalanced at next trading day's opening as the momentum is not due to any new information. This means that the momentum is due to automatic actions from the ETFs when responding to temporary price pressures.

See also
List of exchange-traded funds
Gold exchange-traded product
Silver exchange-traded product
UCITS

References

Exchange-traded products